Gatineau is a provincial electoral district in the Outaouais region of Quebec, Canada which elects members to the National Assembly of Quebec.  It notably includes parts of the city of Gatineau as well as Val-des-Monts, Cantley and La Pêche.

It was created from parts of Hull for the 1931 election.

In the change from the 2001 to the 2011 electoral map, it gained Val-des-Monts from Papineau electoral district, but lost some territory to Chapleau electoral district.

Members of the Legislative Assembly / National Assembly

Election results

|-
 
|Liberal
|Stéphanie Vallée
|align="right"|14,566
|align="right"|59.80
|align="right"|+14.85

|-

|-
|}

|-
 
|Liberal
|Stéphanie Vallée
|align="right"|13,602
|align="right"|44.95
|align="right"|-15.74

|-

|-

|-
|}
* Increase is from UFP

|-
 
|Liberal
|Réjean Lafrenière
|align="right"|16,481
|align="right"|60.69
|align="right"|-0.84

|-

|-

|-
|}

|-
 
|Liberal
|Réjean Lafrenière
|align="right"|18,481
|align="right"|61.53
|align="right"|-3.52

|-

|Natural Law
|Yvan Dolan
|align="right"|208
|align="right"|0.69
|align="right"|-0.19
|-
 
|Socialist Democracy
|Benoît Giguère
|align="right"|202
|align="right"|0.67
|align="right"|-
|-

|-
|}

|-
 
|Liberal
|Réjean Lafrenière
|align="right"|19,046
|align="right"|65.05
|align="right"|+9.05

|-

|-

|Natural Law
|Deborah C. Abécassis
|align="right"|259
|align="right"|0.88
|align="right"|-
|-
|}

|-
 
|Liberal
|Réjean Lafrenière
|align="right"|12,179
|align="right"|56.00
|align="right"|-9.23

|-
|}

|-
 
|Liberal
|Michel Gratton
|align="right"|13,571
|align="right"|65.23
|align="right"|+10.67

|-

|Progressive Conservative
|Joseph Mayer
|align="right"|673
|align="right"|3.23
|align="right"|-
|-

|New Democrat
|Luc Villemaire
|align="right"|532 	
|align="right"|2.56
|align="right"|-
|-

|Christian Socialist
|Nathalie Simon
|align="right"|78	
|align="right"|0.37
|align="right"|-
|-
|}

|-
 
|Liberal
|Michel Gratton
|align="right"|12,244
|align="right"|54.56
|align="right"|+5.58

|-

|-
|}

|-
 
|Liberal
|Michel Gratton
|align="right"|13,444
|align="right"|48.98
|align="right"|-21.17

|-

|-

|-
|}

References

External links
Information
 Elections Quebec

Election results
 Election results (National Assembly)

Maps
 2011 map (PDF)
 2001 map (Flash)
2001–2011 changes (Flash)
1992–2001 changes (Flash)
 Electoral map of Outaouais region
 Quebec electoral map, 2011

Politics of Gatineau
Gatineau